Kongo Central, formerly Bas-Congo is one of the 26 provinces of the Democratic Republic of the Congo. Its capital is Matadi.

History

At the time of independence, the area now encompassing Kongo Central was part of the greater province of Léopoldville, along with the capital city of Kinshasa and the districts of Kwango, Kwilu and Mai-Ndombe. Under Belgian colonial rule, the province was known as Bas-Congo (as in "Lower Congo River") and was renamed Kongo Central after independence.

Under the regime of Mobutu Sese Seko from 1965 to 1997, the Congo river was renamed as Zaire. The province was named as Bas-Zaïre. The name was later reverted to Bas-Congo. It was subsequently renamed as Kongo Central in 2015.

Geography

Kongo Central is the only province in the country with an ocean coastline; it has narrow frontage on the Atlantic Ocean. It borders the provinces of Kinshasa to the north-east, Kwango to the east, and the Republic of Angola to the south as well as the Republic of the Congo and Cabinda to the north.

Divisions
The provincial capital is Matadi.
The only other official city is Boma.
The remainder of the province is administratively divided into ten territories, the most of any province:

Before 2015 these territories were divisions of the Bas-Fleuve, Cataractes and Lukaya districts; except for Moanda, which was attached to Boma (a city/district hybrid).

Towns with their 2010 populations are:

Notable People From Kongo Central

Afonso I of Kongo, the sixth ruler of the Kingdom of Kongo.
Paul Panda Farnana, first Congolese with Belgian diploma of higher education.
Joseph Kasa-Vubu, Democratic Republic of the Congo first president.
Simon Kimbangu, founder of Christian new religious movement Kimbanguism.
Writer Zamenga Batukezanga was born in Kongo Central.
Thomas Kanza, Congolese diplomat. He was one of the first Congolese nationals to graduate from a university.
Ne Muanda Nsemi, Bundu dia Kongo leader.
Franco Luambo Makiadi, virtuoso Congolese Rumba guitarist and singer.
Ray Lema, France-based pianist, guitarist, and songwriter.
Sophie Kanza, first Congolese woman to obtain a university degree (politician and sociologist).
Longo-Mbenza Benjamin, Professor of Medicine, Cardiologist.

References

Bibliography

Gillet, J. (1927) Catalogue des plantes du jardin d'essais de la mission de Kisantu. Bruxelles 166 pp.
Pauwels, L. (1993) Nzayilu N'ti – guide des arbres et arbustes de la région de Kinshasa – Brazzaville. Meise , 495 pp.
Latham, P. (2003) Edible caterpillars and their food plants in Bas-Congo Mystole Publications. , 60 pp.
Kibungu Kembelo, A.O. (2004) Plantes medicinales du Bas-Congo et leurs usages DFID. 197 pp.
Latham, P. (2004) Useful plants of Bas-Congo province DFID. , 320 pp.
Latham, P. (2008) Les chenilles comestibles et leurs plantes nourricières dans la province du Bas-Congo DFID. ,44 pp.
Latham, P. et Konda ku Mbuta, A. (2010) Plantes utiles du Bas-Congo. Mystole Publications. , 372 pp.
Latham, P. et Konda ku Mbuta, A. (2011) Some honeybee plants of Bas-Congo province DFID. , 248 pp.
Latham, P. & Konda ku Mbuta, A. (2014) Useful plants of Bas-Congo province , 553 pp.

 
Provinces of the Democratic Republic of the Congo
1962 establishments in the Republic of the Congo (Léopoldville)
States and territories established in 1963
Geopolitical corridors